Aleksei Viktorovich Chizhikov (born 26 February 1969 in Moscow) is a former Russian football player.

Chizhikov played in the Russian Top League with FC Dynamo-Gazovik Tyumen.

References

1969 births
Footballers from Moscow
Living people
Soviet footballers
FC FShM Torpedo Moscow players
FC Dynamo Moscow reserves players
FC Dinamo Sukhumi players
Russian footballers
FC Tyumen players
Russian Premier League players
Association football defenders